Robert John Gregory (born 23 September 1936) was an Australian politician who represented the South Australian House of Assembly seat of Florey for the Labor Party from 1982 to 1993.

References

|-

Members of the South Australian House of Assembly
1936 births
Living people
Australian Labor Party members of the Parliament of South Australia